Sticker may refer to any of the following:

 A sticker, an adhesive label
 Sticker (Internet), mobile apps emoticon
 Sticker grass (disambiguation), burr-producing plants
 Bumper sticker, on an automobile bumper
 The Schulenburg Sticker, a Texas, US newspaper
 Sticker (album), 2021, by NCT 127
"Sticker" (song)

Places
 Sticker, Cornwall, a village in England

People
 Josephine Sticker, an Austrian freestyle swimmer